Al-Sahel (also transliterated As-Sahel and As-Sehel) is a Syrian village in the An-Nabek District of the Rif Dimashq Governorate. According to the Syria Central Bureau of Statistics (CBS), al-Sahel had a population of 5,677 in the 2004 census. Its inhabitants are predominantly Sunni Muslims.

Nearby cities and towns

Weather

References

Bibliography

External links
 Al-Sahel Page
 Al-Sahel Site

Populated places in An-Nabek District